Yvonne Todd (born 1973) is a contemporary New Zealand photographer known for her manipulation of conventional photographic techniques and genres.

Early life and education
Todd was born in Takapuna, Auckland. In the mid 1990s, she studied professional photography at Unitec Institute of Technology. She completed a Bachelor of Fine Arts at Elam School of Fine Arts in 2001.

Career

Todd won the inaugural Walters Prize (New Zealand's largest contemporary art prize) in 2002 at age 28 for her collection of work Asthma & Eczema, which had been her final-year submission at art school.

In 2014 and 2015 City Gallery Wellington mounted a major survey of her works Yvonne Todd: Creamy Psychology, including over 150 pieces, curated by Robert Leonard.

Exhibitions

Solo exhibitions

Dead Starlets Assoc, IMA, Brisbane (2007)
Wall of Seahorsel, Dunedin Public Art Gallery (2012–2013)
Yvonne Todd: Creamy Psychology, City Gallery Wellington (2014–2015)
 Barnacles – Yvonne Todd, Tauranga Art Gallery (2016)

Group exhibitions

 Telecom Prospect 2004: New Art New Zealand, City Gallery Wellington (2004)
 Mixed-up Childhood, Auckland Art Gallery (2005)
 Busan Biennale, Republic of Korea (2006)
 Blood, in its Various Forms at the Institute of Modern Art, Brisbane (2007)
 Fotofestival, Mannheim, Germany (2009)
 17th Biennale of Sydney (2010)
 Unnerved: The New Zealand Project, National Gallery of Victoria and Queensland Art Gallery (2010)
 Edinburgh Art Festival (2014)

Publications

Robert Leonard (ed), Dead Starlets Assoc, Brisbane: Institute of Modern Art, 2007. 
Robert Leonard (ed), Creamy Psychology, Wellington: City Gallery Wellington and Victoria University Press, 2014.

Further information
Robert Leonard and Janita Craw, Mixed-up Childhood, Auckland: Auckland Art Gallery, 2005. 
Lara Strongman (ed), Contemporary New Zealand photographers, Auckland: Mountain View Pub, 2005. 
David Eggleton, Into the light : a history of New Zealand photography, Nelson: Craig Potton, 2006. 
Maud Page, Wystan Curnow, et al., Unnerved : the New Zealand project, Brisbane: Queensland Art Gallery, 2010.

References

External links
Artist's website
Seagulls Kipling: Megan Dunn interviews Yvonne Todd, Circuit, 2014
Interview with Yvonne Todd, Saturday Morning with Kim Hill, Radio New Zealand National, 6 December 2014
An index of sale results and essays about Yvonne Todd's work

1973 births
Living people
New Zealand artists
New Zealand women artists
New Zealand photographers
New Zealand women photographers
Elam Art School alumni
Unitec Institute of Technology alumni
People from Takapuna
21st-century women photographers
Artists from Auckland
Photographers from Auckland